Mother Takes a Vacation (Swedish: Mamma tar semester) is a 1957 Swedish comedy film directed by Schamyl Bauman and starring Gerd Hagman, George Fant and Karl-Arne Holmsten. It was shot at the Centrumateljéerna Studios in Stockholm. The film's sets were designed by the art director Nils Nilsson.

Synopsis
Sylvia returns to Sweden after several years abroad and is shocked to see how put-upon her sister Karin is by her husband and children, who treat her like a housekeeper. She persuades her to take a vacation in Stockholm to live a little.

Cast
 Gerd Hagman as 	Karin Forsberg
 George Fant as Ragnar Forsberg
 Karl-Arne Holmsten as 	Gunnar Broms
 Gaby Stenberg as 	Sylvia
 Elsa Carlsson as 	Elisabeth Broms
 Torsten Lilliecrona as 	Director Broms
 Stig Järrel as	Director Sandell
 Sven Almgren as 	Lennart Forsberg
 Sten Mattsson as Gunnar Forsberg 
 Mona Malm as 	Gittan Broms
 Rut Holm as 	Mrs. Jansson
 Bellan Roos as 	Hilda
 Birgitta Andersson as 	Young Lady in White Fur 
 Sven Arvor as 	Maitre d'
 Lillemor Biörnstad as Miss Lindkvist 
 Astrid Bodin as 	Sales Clerk 
 Jessie Flaws as Kajsa Larsson 
 Pierre Fränckel as 	Sven Leråker 
 Nils Hallberg as 	Karlsson 
 Ulf Johansson as	Jocke 
 Holger Kax as Taxi Driver 
 Sonja Kolthoff as 	Miss Blomkvist 
 Gösta Krantz as 	Bus Driver 
 Märta Ottoson as 	Dinner Guest 
 Olav Riégo as 	Dinner Guest 
 Birger Sahlberg as 	Bus Passenger
 Karl-Erik Stark as 	Bartender
 Claes Thelander as Dinner Guest

References

Bibliography 
 Per Olov Qvist & Peter von Bagh. Guide to the Cinema of Sweden and Finland. Greenwood Publishing Group, 2000.

External links 
 

1957 films
1957 comedy films
Swedish comedy films
1950s Swedish-language films
Films directed by Schamyl Bauman
Films set in Stockholm
1950s Swedish films